Sourdough is a class of yeast colony, dough and bread

Sourdough may also refer to:

People
 Forty-niner, California gold rush miners, nicknamed sourdoughs
 Sourdough (Yukon miner), Klondike gold rush miners
 Sourdough, a Yukoner, see List of adjectival and demonymic forms of place names

Persons
 Reuben D'Aigle (1874–1959; nicknamed "Sourdough"), Canadian prospector

Places
 Sourdough, Montana, USA; an unincorporated community in Sweet Grass County
 Sourdough Draw, South Dakota, USA; a draw (valley)
 Sourdough Island, Missoula County, Montana, USA; an island, see List of islands of Montana
 Sourdough Lake, Park County, Montana, USA; a lake, see List of lakes of Park County, Montana
 Sourdough Mountains, Washington State, USA; a mountain range
 Sourdough Mountain (Whatcom County, Washington), USA; a mountain
 Sourdough Peak, Wrangell Mountains, Alaska, USA; a mountain
 Sourdough Glacier, Wind River Range, Wyoming, USA; a glacier

Facilities and structures
 Sourdough Lodge, Richardson Highway, Alaska, USA; an NRHP-listed roadhouse
 Sourdough Inn, Fort Yukon, Alaska, USA; an NRHP-listed hotel
 The Sourdough Saloon, Beatty, Nevada, USA; a Western saloon
 Sourdough Campground, North Fork Smith River (California), USA; a campground
 Sourdough Alley, Red Mountain Resort, Rossland, West Kootenay, British Columbia, Canada; a trail
 Sourdough Hill, Meagher County, Montana, USA; a trail, see List of trails of Meagher County, Montana

Other uses
 Sourdough Air Transport, see List of defunct airlines of the United States (N–Z)
 Sourdough Expedition, the first climbing ascent of the tallest mountain in North America, Denali
 The Sourdoughs (film), an alternate title for the 1952 'Abbott & Costello' film Lost in Alaska
 The Sourdough (magazine), the professional journal of the Alaska Library Association
 Project Sourdough, a cigarette marketing scheme, an alternate name for Project SCUM

See also

 
 Sourdough Sam, the mascot of the NFL's SF 49ers
 Sourdough Mountain Lookout, a fire lookout in the Sourdough Mountains
 The Puratos Sourdough Library, a library of bread doughs at the Puratos Center in Saint-Vith, Belgium
 
 
 Bread (disambiguation)
 Dough (disambiguation)
 Sour (disambiguation)